This list of 1988 motorsport champions is a list of national or international auto racing series with a Championship decided by the points or positions earned by a driver from multiple races.

Open wheel racing

Karting

Sports car

Touring car

Stock car

Rallying

Motorcycle

See also
 List of motorsport championships
 Auto racing

1988 in motorsport
1988 Formula Panda Monza:Fabrizio Bettini